In database design, a persistent object identifier (POID) is a unique identifier of a record on a table, used as the primary key.  Important characteristics of a POID are that it does not carry business information and are not generally exported or otherwise made visible to data users; as such a POID has many of the characteristics of a surrogate key.  The only purpose of the POID is to act as the primary key on the table where it is defined and to be referenced as the foreign key by other tables.  Because POIDs, like surrogate keys, do not carry business information, they are immune to changes in the form or meaning of business data.

See also
 Natural key
 Primary key
 Surrogate key
 Unique key
 Object identifier

External links
 Persistent Object ID Service
 What is a Persistent Object Identifier and why should I care?
 Persistent Object
Database theory